"1000 Oceans" is a song by Tori Amos, released as the second single from her 1999 album To Venus and Back. It reached number 22 on the Hot 100 Singles Sales, though it did not chart on the Hot 100. The song deals with issues of love and loss, and is based on the singer's personal experiences. It was released on September 7, 1999, and was generally well received by critics.

Background
Amos has explained that the idea for the song came to her in a dream. An old African woman was humming the melody to her, and she got up around 5:30 in the morning to record it. She describes writing the transition from the melody line around the words "I can't believe that I would keep, keep you from flying" to "and I would cry 1000 more" as particularly difficult, and what took the longest time. The inspiration for the lyrics came when her father-in-law died, and she claims the song helped her husband deal with the grieving process. The lyrics contain reference to Silbury Hill, an ancient mound in Wiltshire, England. This is a place often visited by Amos and her husband.

Video
The video for the song was directed by Erick Ifergan and filmed by Toby Irwin, and it was shot in a downtown Los Angeles parking lot. It shows Amos singing inside a glass booth. The booth is in a busy street, and as people walk by some stop and stare. Others are engaged in everyday activities, and at one point a full-scale riot breaks out in the street, while Amos behaves like a mere distant observer. The video had its TV debut on MTV's 120 Minutes on October 24, 1999.

Reviews
Reviewers generally had a positive attitude towards "1000 Oceans", and many mentioned it among the better tracks on the album. VH1 said the song was "one of the most billowing songs she's written in a while". The Tech called the melody of this song and "Lust" "powerful ballads" and "some of Tori's finest". Others were less impressed though; Spin magazine called the album track "perhaps the most disappointing", and claimed Amos came across as a "Celine Dion-LeAnn Rimes rip-off".

Track listing
Track listing for the various editions of the single:

US (CD single, Cassette Single; September 7, 1999)

 "1000 Oceans" – 4:18
 "Baker Baker" (Live) – 4:18

US (7" Vinyl Single) (Atlantic 7-84534)

 "1000 Oceans" – 4:17
 "Baker Baker" (Live non LP version) – 3:56

US (Enhanced cd, includes "1000 Oceans" and "Bliss"video, September 28, 1999)

 "1000 Oceans" (Album Version) – 4:18Secretime
 "Baker Baker" (Live Non LP Version) – 3:53
 "Winter" (Live Non LP Version) – 7:01

Australia (January 10, 2000)

 "1000 Oceans" (Album Version) – 4:18Secretime
 "Baker Baker" (Live Non LP Version) – 3:53
 "Winter" (Live Non LP Version) – 7:01

France

 "1000 Oceans" (radio edit)

Germany

 "1000 Oceans"
 "Hey Jupiter" (live)
 "Upside Down" (live)

Charts

Weekly charts

References

External links

 Extracts from interviews with Tori Amos about the song

Tori Amos songs
1999 singles
Commemoration songs
Atlantic Records singles
Songs written by Tori Amos
1999 songs